The Citadel Bulldogs baseball teams represented The Citadel, The Military College of South Carolina in Charleston, South Carolina, United States.  The program was established in 1899, and has continuously fielded a team since 1947.  Their primary rivals are College of Charleston, Furman and VMI.

1990

1991

Roster

Coaches

Schedule

1992

Roster

Coaches

Schedule

1993

Roster

Coaches

Schedule

1994

Roster

Coaches

Schedule

1995

Roster

Coaches

Schedule

1996

Roster

Coaches

Schedule

1997

Roster

Coaches

Schedule

1998

Roster

Coaches

Schedule

1999

Roster

Coaches

Schedule

MLB Draft picks

References

The Citadel Bulldogs baseball seasons